The Seventh Seal is the third solo studio album by American rapper Rakim. It was released November 17, 2009, after several delays on Rakim's own Ra Records, TVM, and SMC Recordings and distributed through Fontana and Universal Music Group. Considered a comeback album after a ten-year hiatus, the album features the singles "Holy Are You," which was released on July 14, 2009, and "Walk These Streets" released on October 7, 2009. It features production from Nottz, Needlz, Jake One, and Nick Wiz.

The album sold 12,000 copies in the United States by November 22, 2009, according to SoundScan. Upon its release, The Seventh Seal received generally mixed or average reviews from most music critics, based on an aggregate score of 59/100 from Metacritic.

Background

Recording
The original title for the album was Oh, My God, with the original release date set for 2002, but Rakim left Dr. Dre's Aftermath record label and the project was shelved. The official reason for Rakim's departure was creative differences with Dre.

After leaving the label, Rakim began recording new songs for the album and Dr. Dre allowed him to keep the songs that he originally produced. In 2007, Rakim decided to record completely new songs for the album. In an interview with Billboard on July 13, 2009, when asked whether the album contains material from the unreleased Aftermath project, he stated "No, that's locked down in the lab for now. This is me live from New York City, everything brand new."

Music

Concept
In an interview with Billboard in 2007, when asked about story behind the title, Rakim said,

In an interview in early 2009, when asked about the new generation of hip hop fans, Rakim said,

In another interview with Billboard in 2009, he stated,

In another interview with Billboard in November 2009, Rakim said,

"The majority of this album has that melodic New York sound- I just tried to make it a good, all-around New York album," he says. "That's why I did songs like 'Euphoria,' with [New York rappers] Jadakiss, Busta Rhymes and Styles P-wanted to make sure our presence was felt."

Production and guests
Rakim confirmed that The Seventh Seal would have 14 tracks, with the main guests being Maino, I.Q., and his own daughter Destiny Griffin. Several songs on the album were produced by longtime Rakim collaborator Nick Wiz and featured beats from Nottz, Needlz, SR. Shakur Jake One, and from Italian rapper/producer Bassi Maestro.

Track listing
The track listing was confirmed by Defsounds and Myspace.

Charts

References

Rakim albums
2009 albums
Albums produced by Jake One
Albums produced by Nottz
Albums produced by Needlz
Albums produced by Ty Fyffe
SMC Recordings albums
Albums produced by Neo da Matrix